Andrew Lauder (born 1948, Hartlepool, County Durham, England) is a record company executive and former A&R manager.  Initially noted for his adventurous signings of bands as diverse as Bonzo Dog Doo-Dah Band, Can, Hawkwind and Brinsley Schwarz to Liberty Records and United Artists Records in the 1960s and 70s, he went on to form numerous independent labels including Radar Records, F-Beat Records and Demon Music Group.

Early life
Lauder was born in Hartlepool, County Durham, England in 1948, the son of a timber yard owner, he attended Wellingborough School, Northamptonshire.  He moved to London around 1965 to look for a job. He joined Southern Music, as an accounts clerk.

Liberty and United Artists Records
In 1967 a friend introduced Lauder to Bob Reisdorf, who was launching Liberty Records in the UK. Lauder was initially "label manager" and oversaw the reissuing of back catalogues including Eddie Cochran and Fats Domino, before making himself Liberty's Artists and Repertoire (A&R) manager and quickly signing The Idle Race, Family and the Bonzo Dog Doo-Dah Band. Also, in 1968 Tony McPhee & The Groundhogs for £50. On the Liberty sampler Gutbucket (1969) Lauder placed The Bonzo's spoof 'Can Blue Men Sing The Whites' directly after Tony McPhee's 'No More Doggin'. In 1971 The Groundhog's 'Split' LP was the best selling record on the Liberty / UA label. Liberty primarily signed hippy or underground "album bands", and also licensed a number of US acts such as Captain Beefheart.  Lauder largely ignored the pop market, although the label had a few UK hit singles such as Creedence Clearwater Revival's "Proud Mary".

In 1968, Liberty was bought by Transamerica Corporation and then absorbed by their existing label United Artists Records, Lauder becoming head of A&R for United Artists in the UK. In 1969 United Artists rebuffed Chrysalis Records’ attempt to poach Lauder, and gave him greater control. During Lauder's tenure at Liberty Records (based in Mortimer Street, London) he organised the Liberty Records Football team made up of various young industry luminaries and occasional guests who played regular friendly matches at Colliers Wood, South London. Among the players were Leapy Lee, Dave Margerrison, Dick Leahy and Daily Mirror editor Richard Stott.

Lauder's personal music preferences were West Coast hippy bands such as Quicksilver Messenger Service and the Grateful Dead, which was reflected in his signing bands like Man and Help Yourself; but Lauder became known for releasing an extremely diverse range of bands; from Krautrock:- Can, Amon Düül II and Neu! via Underground music:- Hawkwind and Motörhead to Pub rock:- Brinsley Schwarz, Dr Feelgood and The Inmates and then Punk rock, signing The Stranglers and Buzzcocks shortly before leaving United Artists.

Lauder commissioned a number of notable artists, including Barney Bubbles, Rick Griffin and Hapshash and the Coloured Coat and used a wide variety of promotional techniques: coloured vinyl, elaborate album covers, limited edition budget albums and charity concerts.

Lauder brought the Flamin' Groovies to Britain even though they had been turned down by United Artists in the US. He would also stick with artists who left bands in his roster, e.g. signing Motorhead, Michael Moorcock and Robert Calvert from Hawkwind, and Deke Leonard, Clive John and The Neutrons when they left Man. His personal interests were reflected in events such as the "United Artists 'Save Hartlepool Football Club' weekend"

Independent record companies
In 1977, Lauder was offered major role at Arista Records, but instead, he co-founded Radar Records with Martin Davis.  Radar took on several Stiff Records acts, including Nick Lowe, Elvis Costello and the Attractions and Yachts. Lauder and Jake Riviera opened F-Beat Records in 1979, and several acts, notably Elvis Costello and the Attractions and Nick Lowe, transferred from Radar Records. Lauder and Riviera also started Demon Music Group in 1980, to concentrate on the singles market, early signings including Department S and Bananarama.

Lauder was briefly with Island Records, signing U2 in March 1980 and offering Buzzcocks frontman Pete Shelley a solo record deal. In 1988, he formed the UK based Silvertone Records under the Zomba Group of Companies. Initially focusing on indie bands such as The Stone Roses, he expanded their roster to include Peter "Sonic Boom" Kember John Lee Hooker, J.J. Cale and The Men They Couldn't Hang.

In 1993 Lauder started "This Way Up" label whose signings included Ian McNabb, The Warm Jets, Tindersticks, Redd Kross and Pal Shazar. By 2002 he was living in Knowstone, Devon, where he ran Acadia and Evangeline (not to be confused with the US Evangeline Records label) releasing albums by Ronnie Lane, Spirit, Gov't Mule, Loudon Wainwright III and The Steepwater Band and employed local schoolgirl Joss Stone on work experience. These labels later became part of Floating World Records.

References

1948 births
Living people
British music industry executives
People educated at Wellingborough School
People from Hartlepool